George Lyndes Lorillard (March 26, 1843 – February 3, 1886) was an American tobacco manufacturer, yachtsman, and a prominent Thoroughbred racehorse owner.

Early life
He was born in Westchester, New York, the son of Pierre Lorillard III (1796-1867) and Catherine Griswold. In 1760, his great-grandfather founded P. Lorillard and Company in New York City to process tobacco, cigars, and snuff. Lorillard Tobacco Company remains the oldest tobacco company in the United States to this day.

Lorillard graduated with a degree in medicine from the Yale Scientific School in 1862.

Yachting

Lorillard was an avid yachtsman and bought the sloop Eva in 1865. He joined the New York Yacht Club in 1866. He then bought the yacht Magic and won the Regatta at the New York Yacht Club in 1866. He built the Challenge, which sank in a storm in the Bahamas. He built and launched the schooner Meteor in 1869 and took her to the Mediterranean. In 1871, he owned the yacht  Enchantress that was designed by Robert Fish. He sold the Enchantress and gave up yachting in 1872 to pursue horse racing.

Thoroughbred horse racing
George Lorillard, like his brother Pierre, was a prominent racehorse owner in New York, New Jersey and Maryland. At his Long Island estate, he built a large stable and training track. Lorillard arranged to take in boys from the New York House of Refuge, who were given stable work and educated in a specially built schoolroom. The boys learned to ride horses and after a five-year apprenticeship were given an opportunity to become a professional jockey. Notable among them was Tom Costello, who won numerous important races, including three American Classics.

George Lorillard's racing stable was handled firstly by trainer Wyndham Walden followed by John Alcock. Notably, Lorillard and Walden won the Preakness Stakes a record five straight years between 1878 and 1882; the Belmont Stakes in 1878, 1880, and 1881; and the Travers Stakes in 1878 and 1880. Among George Lorillard's best horses were Saunterer, Spinaway, Vanguard, Grenada, Tom Ochiltree, and Duke of Magenta.

In 1878, George Lorillard headed a group of investors which included David D. Withers and Gordon Bennett, Jr., who bought Monmouth Park Racetrack. Opened on July 4, 1890, the track flourished and became known as the "Newmarket of America."

Personal life
In 1882, George Lorillard was married to Marie Louise La Farge (1845–1899), the sister of artist John La Farge, and the aunt of Christopher Grant La Farge. Marie was the former wife of Edward Whyte, whom she divorced before marrying Lorillard.

Death
George Lorillard died in Nice, France in 1886, aged 42.  His funeral was held in Grace Church in New York City, on April 17.

After his death, Lorillard's widow married in 1889 the Spanish-Mexican Count de Ágreda, becoming Countess de Ágreda. After the Count's death, she married Leopold Morse (son of Leopold Morse), who changed his name to Leopold Morse de Ágreda.

Legacy
In 1884, he sold much of this estate to William Bayard Cutting, who built a notable house, Westbrook, on the land. Lorillard also maintained a winter home in St. Augustine, Florida.

Lorillard Avenue in The Bronx is named for him and his brother Pierre.

References

External links
 March 9, 1879 New York Times article on the Lorillard racing stable
 May 11, 1998 Sports Illustrated article on the Preakness Stakes and George Lorillard

Bibliography
 Reeves, Richard Stone, and Ashforth, David. Crown Jewels of Thoroughbred Racing (1997) Eclipse Press 

1843 births
1892 deaths
American tobacco industry executives
American racehorse owners and breeders
Owners of Preakness Stakes winners
Owners of Belmont Stakes winners
People from Westchester County, New York
Lorillard family
People from St. Augustine, Florida